Julesburg School District Re-1 is a school district headquartered in Julesburg, Colorado.

The district has two schools: the Elementary School and the Jr/Sr High School.

References

Further reading
 Media
  - About a teacher from the Philippines who teaches in the district

External links
 
 Julesburg RE-1 - Northeast Colorado Board of Cooperative Educational Services (BOCES)

School districts in Colorado
Sedgwick County, Colorado